Al-Qudwa, also spelled, al-Qudwah, Kudwah, Qidwa, is a famous family of notables in the city of Gaza in the State of Palestine of the Ashraf class . The family is also known as Arafat, Arafat al-Qudwa or Arafat al-Qudwa al-Husseini .

History and background
House of Al-Qudwa family members were prominent figures since the seventeenth century.  The family traces its origins to two brothers, Sayed Mohammad bin Yusef al-Qudwa and Sayed Arafat bin Yusef al-Qudwa (the first), who settled in Gaza in 1658 AD. They had moved from Aleppo, Syria where the family was also known as "al-Nabhani"  and where branches still exist in that city till today, and known as "al-Nabhani al-Qudwa al-Hussieni" since 1200 AD.   The family very quickly established itself as notables in Gaza through extensive endowments made by Sayed Mohammad bin Arafat al-Qudwa around 1688 AD, and then later by his descendants. The Qudwas were always known as notables by belonging to the Ashraf class, the highest hereditary title of nobility to the highest social/political class in the Muslim World; also known in pre-modern society as the Hashemites- belonging to the Quraish tribe, Hashim branch/Al-Hussieni line (Al-Hussien is the second son of Sayedah Fatimah daughter of prophet Muhammad and Imam Ali the Fourth Caliph in Islam; both are Hashimites). A Hashemite is the Latinate version of the (Arabic: هاشمي, transliteration: Hāšimī) and traditionally refers to those belonging to the Banu Hashim, or "clan of Hashim", a clan within the larger Quraish tribe. It also refers to an Arab dynasty whose original strength stemmed from being the direct descendants of prophet Ishmael the son of prophet Ibrahim in the Hejaz region of Arabia, along the Red Sea. The Hashemites trace their ancestry from Sayed Hashim ibn Abd Manaf (died and buried in Gaza around 510 AD), the great-grandfather of the Islamic prophet Muhammad, although the definition today mainly refers to the descendants of the prophet's daughter, Sayedah Fatimah, the more accurate definition is the descendants of Sayed Hashim ibn Abd Manaf.

According to the Islamic court registers and many historical accounts, the first few Qudwas in Gaza were traders and businessmen, and it seemed that they were well-off, managing enormous wealth in terms of endowments, farmland, assets, and luxurious dwellings in Gaza.  Family fortunes later included homes and farmland in the vicinity of Jaffa and Jerusalem.  In fact, in the mid 18th century their assets extended to include endowments and property still owned in Egypt, where a leading Qudwa, Sayed Mohammad bin Arafat (the third), and his two sons, Sayed Abdullah and Sayed Mustafa, had lived (for part of their life times) and managed their vast business. Sayed Mohammad bin Arafat died in 1774 in Egypt, and his two sons returned to Gaza.  

In Gaza, Sayed Mustafa Arafat Al Qudwa served as Naqeeb al-Ashraf, (equal to Archduke: the son or male-line grandson of a sovereign nobleman), of the Hashemite nobility, or the head of the Ashraf class, descendants of Islamic prophet Muhammad in the late 18th century.  This prestigious post, held only by very few Hashemite families in history; and this post has been in this family since 1000 AD, held by Al Shareef Al Sayed Solaiman bin AlHassan, the great grand father of the Qudwas, in Iraq during the Abbasid Caliphate (Arabic: العبّاسيّون, al-‘Abbāsīyūn), the Noble post was handed down to the son of Sayed Mustafa Arafat al-Qudwa, Sayed Ahmad al-Qudwa, who held the post till his death.  The post of Naqeeb al-Ashraf was inherited by Ahmad's son, Sayed Yusuf, who remained as Naqeeb until he died sometime around 1828.  The office was then filled by his son, Sayed Hussiein al-Qudwa, who was only 12 years old at that time, attesting to the influence and prestige that family had wielded at that time.  He was probably the youngest Naqeeb in history.  Sayed Hussien held the position till 1844, the year he was removed.   This position, later on, was occupied by a relative, Sayed Dawood al-Qudwa in 1883, who is the grandfather of the Palestinian president Sayed Muhammad Yasser Arafat Al-Qudwa Al-Hussieni commonly known as Yasser Arafat. Sayed Dawood died in 1911.                

Other influential positions, such as civil administrative offices, were occupied by leading Qudwas.  Sayed Suleiman bin Mohammad bin Naqeeb Mustafa al-Qudwa was elected member of the Gaza city municipality council.  He died in Egypt after 1846, which meant that the family had retained business ties in Egypt.  Sayed Suleiman's wife was Princess Quoot AlQuloob daughter of Prince Najem Eldeen Basha Altomertash ( Chief Justice under the Egyption monarchy in 1766 ) .  Sayed Suleiman left several sons, one of whom, Sheikh Sayed Abdul-Razzaq, was also elected to the city municipality council.  Sheikh Sayed Abdul-Razzaq was also a traditionally-trained Islamic scholar who had studied under scholars (Ulema) at the famous al-Azahar mosques (University) in Egypt,  he died in 1872.    Sayed Mahmood (d. 1942), the son of Sayed Abdul-Razzaq, was also a prominent figure in the post-Ottoman period.  He served on the council of Awqaf (Endowments), and managed the huge Qudwa endowment. 

The most famous member of the family is the late Palestinian president and PLO leader, Yasser Arafat.

Prominent members 
Yasser Arafat, His real name is Mohammad Yasser Abdul Raouf Dawoud Arafat al-Qudwa al-Hussieni, President of Palestinian National Authority, Chairman of PLO, and  Laureate of the Nobel Prize
Fathi Arafat, founder and chairman of the Palestine Red Crescent Society, and member of the Palestinian National Council.
Moussa Arafat, head of the Palestinian Public Security Service in the Gaza Strip.
Muhammad al-Qudwa, governor of the Gaza Governorate (1996–2014)
Nasser al-Qudwa, former Foreign Affairs Minister of the Palestinian National Authority, UN special envoy to Syria.

References

Palestinian families